Arithmetic  for Parents (Sumizdat, 2007) is a book about mathematics education aimed at parents and teachers.

The author, Ron Aharoni, is a professor of mathematics at the Technion; he wrote the book based on his experiences teaching elementary mathematics to Israeli schoolchildren.
The book was originally written in Hebrew and was translated to English, Portuguese and Dutch.

References

Elementary arithmetic
Israeli non-fiction books
Books about mathematics education